Caroline Sinavaiana-Gabbard (born 1946) is an American Samoan academic, writer, poet, and environmentalist. She was the first Samoan to become a full professor in the United States. She is the sister of American politician Mike Gabbard and the aunt of American politician Tulsi Gabbard.

Sinavaiana-Gabbard was born in Utulei village, Tutuila, American Samoa and educated at Sonoma State University, University of California, Berkeley, and the University of Hawai'i. Her PhD thesis was on Traditional comic theater in Samoa : a holographic view. She taught creative writing at the University of Hawai'i for nearly twenty years and is currently an Associate Professor of Pacific literature at the University of Hawai'i at Mānoa. In 2002 she published her collection of poetry, Alchemies of Distance.

In August 2020 she was named by USA Today on its list of influential women from U.S. territories.

References

Living people
1946 births
People from Eastern District, American Samoa
Samoan emigrants to the United States
Sonoma State University alumni
University of California, Berkeley alumni
University of Hawaiʻi at Mānoa alumni
University of Hawaiʻi faculty
American Samoan writers
American Samoan educators